Babelomurex tectumsinensis, common name : the lamellose coral shell, is a species of sea snail, a marine gastropod mollusk in the family Muricidae, the murex snails or rock snails.

Description
The shell size varies between 20 mm and 40 mm

Distribution
This species is distributed in the Caribbean Sea along Panama, Colombia and Venezuela and in the Mediterranean Sea

References

 Cossignani T. (2010) Validazione di Babelomurex tectumsinensis (Deshayes, 1856). Malacologia Mostra Mondiale 66: 19

External links
 

tectumsinensis
Gastropods described in 1856